Andorra first participated at the Olympic Games in 1976. They have appeared in every games since they first entered. They have also appeared in every Winter Olympic Games since 1976.

They have never won a medal in the Summer or Winter games.  At the summer games, they have competed in sports including cycling, swimming, athletics, shooting and judo. As a mountainous country with popular skiing resorts, Andorra's winter olympic delegation has often been as large as or larger than its summer team, and all its participations have come in skiing or snowboarding sports.

They have been represented by Comitè Olímpic Andorrà since 1976.

Medal tables

Medals by Summer Games

Medals by Winter Games

Flagbearers

References

External links